Georgia Henshaw (born 11 July 1993) is a Welsh actress best known for her roles on British television. Among her leading roles have been those of Rosie, a member of "The Ace Gang" in Angus, Thongs and Perfect Snogging, and as JJ's love interest, Lara, in Skins. She has also appeared as Cassie Claypole in the BBC Three show Two Pints of Lager and a Packet of Crisps. From 2011 to 2012, she starred in the BBC One school-based drama series, Waterloo Road, as Madi Diamond.

Filmography

References

External links

1993 births
Living people
People educated at Olchfa School
Actresses from Swansea
Welsh child actresses
Welsh film actresses
Welsh television actresses
21st-century Welsh actresses